Richard Scott Chambers (born 10 June 1985) is a British rower, and is the brother of fellow rower Peter Chambers. At the 2012 Summer Olympics in London he was part of the British crew that won the silver medal in the lightweight men's four.

Biography
Richard began rowing at the age of 14, at Coleraine Academical Institution, under the coaching of Bobby Platt.  He later left Coleraine Inst and joined Bann Rowing Club Coleraine at the age of 16, and went on to represent Ireland in the junior pair at the 2003 Home Internationals in Cork with Stephen Feeney, under the coaching of Simon Hamilton (Bann Rowing Club).

He attended Oxford Brookes University reading Construction Management and rowed for the university boat club, coached by Peter Haining and Richard Spratley. It was there that he progressed into the Great Britain Rowing team.

In 2005, Richard attended the World Under-23 Rowing Championships held in Amsterdam, where he took silver in the Lightweight Men's Quadruple Scull.  The following year he won a gold medal and a world best-time in the under-23 Lightweight Men's Pair event with Chris Bartley at Hazewinkel (Belgium).  He attended his first senior World Rowing Championships later on that summer (held at Dorney Lake) in the Lightweight Men's Pair.

In 2007 he rowed in the lightweight men's four, alongside James Clarke, Paul Mattick and James Lindsay-Fynn.  Together they won the 2007 Rowing World Cup Series, and went on to take the gold medal at the World Rowing Championships in Munich-Oberschleissheim.  The following year the same quartet represented Great Britain at the 2008 Beijing Olympic Games, where they finished in fifth place.

At the 2010 World Rowing Championships at Lake Karapiro, New Zealand, he won the gold medal in the lightweight men's four, together with Paul Mattick, Rob Williams and Chris Bartley. He was part of the British squad that topped the medal table at the 2011 World Rowing Championships in Bled, where he won a bronze medal as part of the lightweight coxless four with Chris Bartley, Paul Mattick and Rob Williams. He competed at the 2013 World Rowing Championships in Chungju, where he won a bronze medal as part of the lightweight double sculls with is brother Peter.

He competed at the 2014 World Rowing Championships in Bosbaan, Amsterdam, where he won a bronze medal as part of the lightweight coxless four with Mark Aldred, Chris Bartley and his brother Richard.

He was part of the British team that topped the medal table at the 2015 World Rowing Championships at Lac d'Aiguebelette in France, where he won a silver medal as part of the lightweight double scull with Will Fletcher.

References

External links
 Richard Chambers at British Rowing
 
 
 

Living people
1985 births
English male rowers
People educated at Coleraine Academical Institution
Rowers at the 2008 Summer Olympics
Rowers at the 2012 Summer Olympics
Rowers at the 2016 Summer Olympics
Olympic rowers of Great Britain
Olympic silver medallists for Great Britain
Olympic medalists in rowing
Medalists at the 2012 Summer Olympics
Sportspeople from County Londonderry
Alumni of Oxford Brookes University
World Rowing Championships medalists for Great Britain
Rowers from Northern Ireland
European Rowing Championships medalists